Konnivesi is a medium-sized lake of Finland in the Kymijoki main catchment area. It is located partly in region Päijänne Tavastia, near the town Heinola, partly in region Kymenlaakso. There is a waterway crossing the Heinola town and connecting the lake to another lake Ruotsalainen.

See also
List of lakes in Finland

References

Lakes of Heinola
Lakes of Iitti